Alejandro Gonzalez Dominguez (born December 6, 1970) is a Texas Democratic member of the Texas House of Representatives for House District 37, which is located in Cameron County, Texas.

Education 
Dominguez earned his Bachelor of Arts in Political Science from Rice University in Houston in 1993 and his Juris Doctor from the Sandra Day O'Connor College of Law at Arizona State University.

Texas House of Representatives 
On May 22, 2018, Dominguez won a runoff election for Texas House District 37 unseating incumbent Rene Oliveira. He ran unopposed in the November general election.

Dominguez on November 17, 2021 announced his run for the Texas Senate (District 27) to replace Eddie Lucio Jr. who is retiring.

References

External links
 Profile at the Texas House of Representatives
 Alex Dominguez for Texas Senate

Living people
Place of birth missing (living people)
Democratic Party members of the Texas House of Representatives
Hispanic and Latino American state legislators in Texas
21st-century American politicians
Rice University alumni
Sandra Day O'Connor College of Law alumni
1970 births